Mikołaj Cieślak (born 6 December 1973) is a Polish stage, television and film actor, and a cabaret artist. He is a co-creator of Kabaret Moralnego Niepokoju.

Biography 
Cieślak was born on 6 December 1973 in Warsaw, Poland. In 1993, while studying at the technologial department of the University of Warsaw, he and students had formed the cabaret group, that would later evolve into the Kabaret Moralnego Niepokoju. Their first cabaret programme, titled Królewna, Rycerz i Smok, had premiered in 1994 at the Polish studies department of the University of Warsaw. In 1996, the cabaret group was awarded the Grand Prix at the PaKA festival in Kraków.

He had also performed in the Capitol Theatre, Warsaw, in comedies Szwedzki stół by Marek Modzelewski in 2012, and Zdrówko by Robert Górski in 2014. In February of 2015, he had performed in the Polish-Italian-language play Quasi-Paradiso, directed by Robert Talarczyk, that was performed in Teatro Astra, Turin, Italy.

Private life 
He is married and has two dauthers, Maja and Jagoda.

Filmography

Directing 
 2017–2019: The Chairman's Ear

Acting

Feature films 
 2009: Złoty środek as Piotr
 2019: How to Marry A Millionaire as the taxi passenger
 2019: Fierce as a man
 2021: The Getaway King as the negotiating client
 2022: Gdzie diabeł nie może, tam baby pośle as a German person

TV series 
 1999: Badziewiakowie as the firefighter
 2000: 13 posterunek 2 as the murderer of cheese (episode 8)
 2012: Piąty Stadion as crazy Staszek
 2012: Ja to mam szczęście! as Jarosław Klata, the school educator
 2013–2014: Wrzuć na luuuz:
 various characters (2013)
 the neighbour (2014)
 2014: Słodkie życie as Janusz
 2014: Co leci w sieci as the cabaret artist
 2016: Dwoje we troje as the sale hunter
 2016: O mnie się nie martw as Gorzelniak (1 episode)
 2017–2019: The Chairman's Ear as Mariusz
 2017: Na dobre i na złe as Tomasz, Halina's partner (episode 676)
 2018: Za marzenia: as Erwin Anielak, Zosia's boss
 2019: 39 i pół tygodnia as Zielarz (1 episode)
 2019–present: Zainwestuj w marzenia as Erwin Anielak
 2021–present: Kowalscy kontra Kowalscy as Hamlet Wołodyjowski (9 episodes)
 2021–present: Piękni i bezrobotni as Gwidon

Voice acting 
 2016: Doradcy króla Hydropsa as the diopter

Polish-language dubbing 
 2012: The Suicide Shop as the desperate person
 2012: Zambezia as the marabou stork
 2017: Despicable Me 3 as Dru

Talk-show appearance 
 2002: Kuba Wojewódzki as himself

Theatre roles 
 2012: Szwedzki stół, directed by Marek Modzelewski (Capitol Theatre, Warsaw)
 2014: Zdrówko, directed by Robert Górski (Capitol Theatre, Warsaw)
 2015: Quasi-Paradiso, directed by Robert Talarczyk (Teatro Astra, Turin)

References

External links 

 Mikołaj Cieślak at IMDb
 Mikołaj Cieślak at Filmweb (Polish)
 Mikołaj Cieślak at FilmPolski.pl (Polish)

1973 births
Living people
Artists from Warsaw
Polish cabaret performers
Polish comedians
Polish satirists
Polish parodists
University of Warsaw alumni
20th-century Polish male actors
21st-century Polish male actors
Male actors from Warsaw
Polish male film actors
Polish male stage actors
Polish male television actors
Polish male voice actors
Polish television directors